Warren Scarfe (11 December 1936 – 4 November 1964) was an Australian cyclist. He competed at the 1956 Summer Olympics and the 1960 Summer Olympics. He died during a fall in a training run in 1964.

References

External links
 

1936 births
1964 deaths
Australian male cyclists
Olympic cyclists of Australia
Cyclists at the 1956 Summer Olympics
Cyclists at the 1960 Summer Olympics
People from Newcastle, New South Wales
Cyclists at the 1958 British Empire and Commonwealth Games
Commonwealth Games medallists in cycling
Commonwealth Games silver medallists for Australia
Australian track cyclists
Cyclists who died while racing
Road incident deaths in New South Wales
Sport deaths in Australia
Cyclists from New South Wales
20th-century Australian people
Medallists at the 1958 British Empire and Commonwealth Games